Mohamed Ibrahim El-Sayed (born 16 March 1998) is an Egyptian Greco-Roman wrestler. He won one of the bronze medals in the 67 kg event at the 2020 Summer Olympics held in Tokyo, Japan. In 2019, he represented Egypt at the African Games held in Rabat, Morocco and won the gold medal in the men's Greco-Roman 67 kg event. He is a two-time U23 World Champion.

Career 

In 2016, Ibrahim won the gold medal in the 66 kg event at the African Wrestling Championships held in Alexandria, Egypt.

He competed at the 2017 African Wrestling Championships held in Marrakesh, Morocco and won the silver medal in the 75 kg event. In 2018, he won the gold medal in the 66 kg event at the 2018 African Wrestling Championships held in Port Harcourt, Nigeria, and won the gold medal in the 67 kg event at the 2018 World U23 Wrestling Championship held in Bucharest, Romania.

In 2019, Ibrahim won the gold medal in the 67 kg event at the African Wrestling Championships held in Hammamet, Tunisia and reached the semi-finals in the 67 kg event at the 2019 World Wrestling Championships held in Nur-Sultan, Kazakhstan which has qualified him to represent Egypt at the 2020 Summer Olympics in Tokyo, Japan. At the 2019 Military World Games held in Wuhan, China, he won the gold medal in the 67 kg event. In the same year, he also won the gold medal in the men's 67 kg event at the 2019 World U23 Wrestling Championship held in Budapest, Hungary.

In 2020, he won the gold medal in the men's 67 kg event at the African Wrestling Championships held in Algiers, Algeria. The same year, Ibrahim was named by the United World Wrestling association as the best U-23 wrestler. In 2021, he won the silver medal in his event at the 2021 Wladyslaw Pytlasinski Cup held in Warsaw, Poland.

He represented Egypt at the 2020 Summer Olympics in Tokyo, Japan and he won one of the bronze medals in the 67 kg event. In his bronze medal match he defeated Artem Surkov.

He competed in the 67 kg event at the 2022 World Wrestling Championships held in Belgrade, Serbia.

Achievements

References

External links 
 

Living people
Place of birth missing (living people)
Egyptian male sport wrestlers
African Games gold medalists for Egypt
African Games medalists in wrestling
Competitors at the 2019 African Games
Mediterranean Games silver medalists for Egypt
Mediterranean Games medalists in wrestling
Competitors at the 2018 Mediterranean Games
1998 births
African Wrestling Championships medalists
Wrestlers at the 2020 Summer Olympics
Medalists at the 2020 Summer Olympics
Olympic medalists in wrestling
Olympic bronze medalists for Egypt
Olympic wrestlers of Egypt
20th-century Egyptian people
21st-century Egyptian people